State Road 94 (NM 94) is a state highway in the US state of New Mexico. NM 94's southern terminus is at NM 518 in Sapello, and the northern terminus is in Mora at NM 518.

Major intersections

See also

References

094
Transportation in San Miguel County, New Mexico
Transportation in Mora County, New Mexico